The Donor Sibling Registry is a website and non-profit US organization serving donor offspring, sperm donors, egg donors and other donor conceived people. It was founded in September 2000 by a mother-and-son team, Wendy Kramer and Ryan Kramer of Nederland, Colorado.

Purpose and goals
The Donor Sibling Registry (DSR) was founded in 2000 to assist individuals conceived as a result of sperm, egg or embryo donation who are seeking to make mutually desired contact with others with whom they share genetic ties. The DSR has pioneered an international discussion about the donor conception industry and the families, with its research, media appearances, speaking engagements, and interviews. The DSR advocates for the right to honesty and transparency for donor-conceived people, for social acceptance and legal rights, and values the diversity of all families.

History
The DSR began as a Yahoo! group, which was created in September 2000. It was started by Wendy Kramer and her then 10-year-old son Ryan Kramer as a means of communicating with other offspring of artificial insemination. After the first year, the group was home to only 37 members. In October 2002, Wendy created a press release which was sent to local news agencies. The story was picked up by Denver's NBC affiliate, KUSA-TV. Shortly after, a small article about the DSR was written for The Denver Post. This article led to national and international media coverage, giving the DSR enough exposure to grow its member base into the thousands. In 2003 the DSR became a 501(c)3 charity organization and moved from a Yahoo group to its own database website.

Research
The DSR has conducted and published dozens of papers in peer-reviewed academic and legal journals.

Books and booklets
 DNA = Donors Not Anonymous
 Finding Our Families: A First-of-Its-Kind Book for Donor-conceived People and Their Families
 Your Family: A Donor Kid's Story

Matches
When a donor-conceived person, a parent of a donor-conceived person or a sperm or egg donor signs up to the Donor Sibling Registry, they are automatically filed under their respective facility/clinic/cryobank by their donor number.  Matches and messages from potential matches can only be viewed for an annual membership fee. If only one person of a donor number is listed, the posting is white.  When two or more people sign up under the same donor number, they are filed together as a "match".  Matches can occur between half siblings (light yellow), sperm donors and their offspring (dark yellow), or egg donors and their offspring (also dark yellow).

Due to changes in technology and the introduction of the commercially available home DNA tests, the ability of Donor Sibling Registry to be an effective use of resources may be outdated.

See also
Dibling

References

Boulder County, Colorado
Companies based in Boulder, Colorado
Family law
Fertility medicine
Sperm donation
Non-profit organizations based in Colorado
Sibling